Cherokee is an unincorporated community in McDowell County, West Virginia, United States.

References 

Unincorporated communities in West Virginia
Unincorporated communities in McDowell County, West Virginia